Klim is a Russian psychological crime drama television series starring Konstantin Lavronenko as the title character, Detective Chief Inspector Klim, who works in Saint Petersburg, Russia. The series is a direct remake of the BBC TV series Luther.

The show is produced by Sreda for broadcast on Channel One Russia. Shooting began in Moscow in August 2014, and the first episode aired January 2016.

Plot
Klim is a Detective Chief Inspector working for the Serious Crime Unit in Saint Petersburg Police. A dedicated police officer, Klim is obsessive, possessed, and sometimes dangerous in the violence of his fixations.

However, he has paid a heavy price for his dedication; he has never been able to prevent himself from being consumed by the darkness of the crimes with which he deals. For him, the job always comes first. His dedication is a curse and a blessing, both for him and those close to him.

See also
 Luther (TV series), original series

References

External links

Production website

Luther (TV series)
2010s Russian television series
2016 Russian television series debuts
Russian-language television shows
Russian police procedural television series
Russian television series based on British television series
Television series by Sreda
Russian crime television series
Channel One Russia original programming
Fictional portrayals of the Saint Petersburg Police